The 2020–21 Texas Southern Tigers basketball team represented Texas Southern University during the 2020–21 NCAA Division I men's basketball season. The Tigers were led by third-year head coach Johnny Jones and played their home games at the Health and Physical Education Arena in Houston, Texas, as members of the Southwestern Athletic Conference (SWAC). They finished the season 17-9, 11-3 in SWAC Play to finish in 3rd place. They defeated Alcorn State, Jackson State, and Prairie View A&M to be champions of the SWAC tournament. They received the conference’s automatic bid to the NCAA tournament where they defeated Mount St Mary’s in the First Four before losing in the first round to Michigan.

Previous season 
The Tigers finished the 2019–20 season 16–16 overall, 12–6 in SWAC play, to finish third place in the conference. The Tigers defeated Grambling State in the quarterfinals of the SWAC tournament. The remainder of the tournament was cancelled by the National Collegiate Athletic Association due to the COVID-19 pandemic on March 12, 2020.

Offseason

Departures

Roster

Schedule and results

|-
!colspan=9 style=| Non-conference regular season

|-
!colspan=9 style=| SWAC regular season

|-
!colspan=12 style=| SWAC tournament
|-

|-
!colspan=12 style=| NCAA tournament
|-

|-

Source

References

Texas Southern Tigers basketball seasons
Texas Southern
Texas Southern Tigers basketball
Texas Southern Tigers basketball
Texas Southern